Nanami Ishida (born 8 September 1998) is a Japanese professional footballer who plays as a defender for WE League club JEF United Chiba Ladies.

Club career 
Ishida made her WE League debut on 2 October 2021.

References 

WE League players
Living people
1998 births
Japanese women's footballers
Women's association football defenders
JEF United Chiba Ladies players
Association football people from Shizuoka Prefecture